The 1978–79 Detroit Red Wings season was the Red Wings' 47th season, 53rd overall for the franchise. It is the last full season at the Detroit Olympia for the team. A year later, they would move to the then-newly built Joe Louis Arena.

Offseason

Regular season

Final standings

Schedule and results

Playoffs
The Red Wings did not qualify for the playoffs despite qualifying the previous year.

Player statistics

Regular season
Scoring

Goaltending

Note: GP = Games played; G = Goals; A = Assists; Pts = Points; +/- = Plus-minus PIM = Penalty minutes; PPG = Power-play goals; SHG = Short-handed goals; GWG = Game-winning goals;
      MIN = Minutes played; W = Wins; L = Losses; T = Ties; GA = Goals against; GAA = Goals-against average;  SO = Shutouts;

Awards and records

Transactions

Draft picks
Detroit's draft picks at the 1978 NHL Amateur Draft held at the Queen Elizabeth Hotel in Montreal, Quebec. Ladislav Svozil was the first Czechoslovakian player drafted in the history of the NHL Draft. The Red Wings selected Svozil with their 14th pick in the 1978 Draft.

Farm teams

See also
1978–79 NHL season

References

External links

Detroit Red Wings seasons
Detroit
Detroit
Detroit Red
Detroit Red